Rachel Karen Green is a fictional character, one of the six main characters who appeared in the American sitcom Friends. Portrayed by Jennifer Aniston, the character was created by David Crane and Marta Kauffman, and appeared in all of the show's 236 episodes during its decade-long run, from its premiere on September 22, 1994, to its finale on May 6, 2004. Introduced in the show's pilot as a naïve runaway bride who reunites with her childhood best friend Monica Geller and relocates to New York City, Rachel gradually evolves from a spoiled, inexperienced "daddy's girl" into a successful businesswoman. During the show's second season, the character becomes romantically involved with Monica's brother, Ross, with whom she maintains a complicated on-off relationship throughout the series. Together, Ross and Rachel have a daughter, Emma.

The role of Rachel was originally offered to Téa Leoni, the producer's first choice, and Courteney Cox, both of whom declined, Leoni in favor of starring in the sitcom The Naked Truth, and Cox in favor of playing Rachel's best friend Monica in Friends. A virtually unknown actress at the time, who had previously starred in five short-lived sitcoms, Aniston auditioned for the role of Rachel after turning down an offer as a cast member on the sketch comedy show Saturday Night Live. After acquiring the role and before Friends aired, Aniston was temporarily at risk of being recast because she had also been involved with another sitcom, Muddling Through, at the time, which was ultimately cancelled and allowed Aniston to remain on Friends.

Critical reception towards Rachel has remained consistently positive throughout Friends decade-long run, with The A.V. Club attributing much of the show's early success to the character. However, some of her storylines have been criticized, specifically her romantic relationship with her friend Joey Tribbiani during season 10. Rachel's popularity established her as the show's breakout character, who has since been named one of the greatest television characters of all time, while the character's second season haircut spawned an international phenomenon of its own. Named the "Rachel" after her, the character's shag continues to be imitated by millions of women around the world and remains one of the most popular hairstyles in history, in spite of Aniston personally disliking it. Rachel is also regarded as a style icon due to her influence on womenswear during the 1990s. Meanwhile, the character's relationship with Ross is often cited among television's most beloved.

Rachel is considered to be Aniston's breakout role, credited with making her the show's most famous cast member and for spawning her successful film career. Praised for her performance as Rachel, Aniston won both an Emmy Award for Outstanding Lead Actress in a Comedy Series and a Golden Globe Award for Best Performance by an Actress In A Television Series – Comedy Or Musical.

Role 
Rachel debuts in the pilot episode of Friends as a runaway bride who is distraught after abandoning her fiancé Barry Farber (Mitchell Whitfield) at the altar. She locates her high school best friend Monica Geller (Courteney Cox), the only person she knows in New York City, who agrees to let Rachel reside with her while she attempts to reorganize her life. Rachel meets and befriends Monica's friends Phoebe Buffay (Lisa Kudrow), Joey Tribbiani (Matt LeBlanc), and Chandler Bing (Matthew Perry), while reuniting with Monica's older brother Ross Geller (David Schwimmer), who has harbored unrequited romantic feelings for her since high school. Having previously relied on her parents' money her entire life with a sole goal of marrying wealthy, Rachel attempts to reinvent herself as an independent young woman by waitressing at Central Perk, a coffeehouse where her new friends regularly socialize. She is terrible at the job, but remains employed because the manager, Gunther (James Michael Tyler), is in love with her.

As season one concludes, Rachel finds out that Ross is in love with her, and realizes that she loves him, too. When she goes to tell him, however, she finds that he has begun a relationship with a woman named Julie (Lauren Tom). However, Ross eventually chooses Rachel over Julie, and the couple dates for the remainder of the second season. However, their relationship begins to deteriorate during the middle of the third season after Rachel quits her job at the coffeehouse in favor of working in fashion. While Rachel becomes increasingly preoccupied with her new job, Ross grows jealous of her companionship with her coworker Mark (Steven Eckholdt), culminating in Rachel deciding that they should "take a break" from their relationship. Ross interprets this as a sign of their breakup and sleeps with another woman after calling Rachel and learning Mark is with her. Ross and Rachel reunite the following day, but she breaks up with him after finding out about his infidelity.

In the episodes following the break up, Rachel and Ross are initially hostile towards each other, but continue to harbor feelings for each other. During a beach house vacation with their friends, Rachel and Ross briefly reconcile when he ends his relationship with Bonnie (Christine Taylor), only to break up once again due to a disagreement shortly after returning to New York. During season four, Rachel dates her customer Joshua (Tate Donovan), while Ross dates her boss' niece Emily (Helen Baxendale), to whom he eventually gets engaged. Competitively, Rachel proposes to Joshua, frightening him off as his divorce is not yet finalised. Rachel realises she still loves Ross and comes to London to stop their wedding. She decides not to act upon it when seeing how happy he is with Emily, but Ross accidentally utters Rachel's name while exchanging their wedding vows. Ross ultimately divorces Emily after she demands that he end his friendship with Rachel.

At the end of season five, Ross and Rachel drunkenly get married while vacationing with their friends in Las Vegas. In season six, Ross initially wants to remain married to Rachel, but she persuades him to get the annulment. He tells Rachel he's done so but confesses to Phoebe that they're still married.  Rachel eventually finds out and fills in the annulment form, but their annulment request is denied because of Rachel having leveled unfounded allegations against Ross and because of their past relationship, forcing the two to file for a divorce instead. After signing the papers, they admit that if they ever got married properly, it would be the one that lasted. In season seven, Ross and Rachel have sex, and Rachel gets pregnant. Rachel gives birth to a girl in season eight, naming the baby Emma Geller-Green; the name Emma is a gift from Monica, who had previously been reserving the name for her own child. In a misunderstanding, Rachel believes that Joey had proposed to her, Joey having told her he loved her a few months earlier, whereas he had simply picked up Ross' engagement ring.  Rachel and Ross live together as non-romantic roommates during the first half of season nine. After an argument following Rachel kissing her colleague Gavin (Dermot Mulroney) and giving her phone number to a man she met at a bar, Rachel leaves Ross and moves back in with Joey.

At the end of season nine, Rachel begins to develop feelings for Joey. Joey confesses that he still has feelings for Rachel, and they decide to try dating. They break up in season ten, however, both because their romance upsets Ross and because they realize that they do not work as a couple.

Rachel eventually finds a job opportunity in France, but has second thoughts when Ross tells her he still loves her. Rachel ultimately decides to stay and reignite her relationship with Ross, getting off the plane at the last minute.

In the first episode of the spin-off/sequel Joey, it is implied that Ross and Rachel remarried shortly after the events of the Friends finale, as Joey tells his sister Gina (Drea de Matteo) that all of his friends have gotten married. In the episode "Joey and the Breakup", while discussing his relationship with Sarah (Mädchen Amick), Joey mentions Rachel to Gina, though not by name, as the only woman he ever confessed his love to, which led to brief heartbreak when Rachel did not reciprocate his feelings, as Joey says, "We were living together, she was pregnant with my best friend's baby and she ended up with him."

During the 2021 reunion special, David Schwimmer and Jennifer Aniston both said they imagined that Ross and Rachel had remarried after the end of the series.

Development

Conception and writing 

After their short-lived television series Family Album was canceled, television writers David Crane and Marta Kauffman pitched Friends to then-NBC president Warren Littlefield as a sitcom about "that special time in your life when your friends are your family," basing the show on their own experiences as young people living in New York; the main characters themselves were inspired by their own friends. Conceived as a young woman who is unprepared for adulthood, the character Rachel Green (occasionally spelled Greene) was originally named Rachel Robbins in the pilot. Although critics and audiences initially perceived Monica as the show's main character when Friends premiered, the writers had actually given Rachel the pilot's most prominent storyline. Before deciding that Rachel and Ross would be an item for the entire series, the writers had originally intended for the show's defining couple to be Joey and Monica. However, after the success of the pilot, in which Rachel and Ross' developing romance is first hinted at, and witnessing Aniston and co-star David Schwimmer's on-screen chemistry for the first time, Crane and Kauffman determined that the entire series relied on "finding all the wonderful roadblocks for them to be with each other".

Audiences began rooting for Rachel and Ross' union from the very beginning of Friends, openly voicing their frustration with Rachel's obliviousness to Ross' feelings for her. The episode that would ultimately transform the friends' relationship for the remainder of the series was the first-season finale "The One Where Rachel Finds Out", in which Rachel finally learns of Ross' true feelings for her, at the same time discovering she actually feels the same. However, the episode nearly went unwritten because, at the time, few Friends writers were expecting the couple's relationship to morph into the phenomenon that it ultimately became. The episode was first suggested by director James Burrows; the writers felt that it was time to alter the couple's dynamic in order to avoid the repetitive "he's pining, she's oblivious" pattern, using the work of author Jane Austen as inspiration on how to finally shift the pining arc from Ross to Rachel. Because stakes for the episode were unprecedentedly high, "The One Where Rachel Finds Out" became Friends' most reworked episode. The couple's first kiss at the end of season two's "The One Where Ross Finds Out" was met with deafening applause from the studio audience. Crane admitted that keeping viewers interested in their relationship for ten years was challenging. Jonathan Bernstein of The Daily Telegraph believes that they accomplished this by "dangl[ing] the possibility of a Ross and Rachel recoupling through several cliffhangers without ever putting them back together". According to Encyclopedia of Television author Horace Newcomb, Ross and Rachel's ever-changing relationship "converted the traditional amnesic plotlines of the situation comedy into ones akin to episodic drama". Meanwhile, writing for The New York Review of Books, Elaine Blair agreed that Friends  created "a sense of chemistry between two characters while also putting obstacles in their way, setting us up for a long-deferred union".

After Rachel and Ross drunkenly get married while on vacation in Las Vegas during season five, Schwimmer had initially objected to the idea of having Ross divorce her – his third divorce – because he felt that it was taking it "too far". The actor explained that "The whole arc of the relationship was weird then ... because for [Ross] to be able to move on enough to marry someone else and then go back to being in love with Rachel later just went a bit too far." Rachel and Joey's romantic storyline was conceived because the writers wanted to delay Ross and Rachel's reunion further. Crane felt that pairing Rachel and Joey during season ten "was for the greater good" because "it was inappropriate". However, the cast initially protested the idea, fearing that Rachel, Joey, and Ross would ultimately become unlikeable characters and audiences would either "resent Joey for going after a pregnant woman, or resent Rachel for rejecting him, or resent Ross for standing between the two of them". Meanwhile, the writers also approached the concept of Rachel's pregnancy and baby tentatively, worrying about how they would include it in the show because they did not want Friends "to become a show about a baby" while "On the other hand, we don't want to pretend that there isn't one." According to Robert Bianco of USA Today, the critical success and popularity of Rachel's pregnancy is ultimately responsible for "propel[ling] the show to the top of the ratings". When it finally came time to write the series finale, "The only thing [Crane and Kauffman] absolutely knew from very early on was that we had to get Ross and Rachel together," deciding, "We had dicked the audience around for 10 years with their 'will they or won’t they,' and we didn’t see any advantage in frustrating them" any longer. However, at one point the writers had deliberated ending the series with Ross and Rachel in "a gray area of where they aren’t together, but we hint there’s a sense that they might be down the road". Ultimately, Crane and Kauffman relented in favor of giving the audience what they wanted.

Casting 
The final character to be cast, Rachel is portrayed by actress Jennifer Aniston, who auditioned for the role shortly after declining a position as a cast member on the sketch comedy show Saturday Night Live. Her decision was initially ridiculed by both her friends as well as actor Adam Sandler, a Saturday Night Live alum. Actress Téa Leoni, who at the time was being referred to by the media as "the next Lucille Ball", was offered the role of Rachel as the studio's first choice, but she declined in favor of starring in the sitcom The Naked Truth. Actress Elizabeth Berkley also auditioned for the role. Other actresses who auditioned for Rachel include Denise Richards, Melissa Rivers, Nicollette Sheridan, Parker Posey, and Jami Gertz. Originally, the producers wanted to cast actress Courteney Cox as Rachel, who Crane and Kauffman were particularly drawn to because of her "cheery, upbeat energy". Additionally, Cox was the most famous cast member at the time amidst an ensemble of relatively unknown actors. However, the actress lobbied for the role of Rachel's best friend Monica, as whom she was ultimately cast, because she felt that she was not "quirky" enough to play Rachel. At the same time, although unbeknownst to each other, Aniston was being considered for the role of Monica, but fought to play Rachel because she felt that the character suited her better. At one point, Cox had begun to regret her decision to play Monica until her own character's storylines started improving.

Friends was Aniston's sixth sitcom; each of her previous ventures had been canceled prematurely. Feeling vulnerable, Aniston had begun to doubt herself as an actress and personally approached Littlefield for reassurance on her career, who encouraged her to audition for Friends, which was being referred to as Friends Like These at the time. Crane and Kauffman had worked with Aniston prior to this. However, casting her as Rachel posed a challenge for the network because, at the time, Aniston was simultaneously starring in a developing CBS sitcom called Muddling Through, in which she plays a young woman whose mother is returning home from jail after two years. CBS was initially reluctant to release Aniston from her contract, which required the actress to balance both roles simultaneously, traveling back-and-forth between Muddling Through and Friends for two weeks. Meanwhile, NBC risked having to recast the role of Rachel, replace Aniston, and reshoot several episodes if CBS' series proved successful, which would have potentially cost the network millions of dollars. However, Littlefield remained confident that Muddling Through would fail. Essentially, the producers of Friends hoped that Muddling Through would be canceled before Friends premiered, while Aniston feared that Muddling Through would be the more successful of the two sitcoms in spite of her preference for Friends. During this time of uncertainty, Aniston was forced not to participate in several Friends-related promotions and photo shoots; the network excluded her from these in case she would be replaced. Aniston explained, "When we were shooting the first grouping of cast photos ... I was asked to step out of a bunch because they didn't know if I was going to be still playing Rachel." Director James Burrows admitted that Aniston had been cast in second position. The producers had already begun auditioning other actresses for the part, while Aniston also received phone calls from her own friends warning her, "I'm auditioning for your part in Friends." Ultimately, Muddling Through was canceled after only three months and 10 episodes, two weeks before the pilot of Friends aired, thus allowing Aniston to keep her role on the show, becoming its second youngest cast member at the age of 25. Crane appreciated Aniston's interpretation of Rachel because "in the wrong hands Rachel is kind of annoying and spoiled and unlikable," commending the actress for "breathing life into a difficult character".

Crane and Kauffman strongly envisioned Friends as an ensemble comedy, and Warner Bros. initially marketed the show as such by having the cast appear in their entirety for all press, interviews and photo shoots. One of few sitcoms at the time to be neither a workplace comedy, family sitcom or star a famous comedian, Elizabeth Kolbert of The New York Times explained that each of the show's main characters are "of equal importance". As a writer, Crane preferred it this way because "utilizing six equal players, rather than emphasizing one or two, would allow for myriad story lines". Kauffman echoed that "Friends worked best when the entire ensemble was onstage." The only reason Aniston is credited first during the show's title sequence is because the cast is listed alphabetically. The show's ensemble format is also believed to have prevented jealous conflicts among the cast. Famously, the Friends cast became the first in television history to negotiate as a group for equal salaries, refusing to work until their demands of $100,000 per episode were met during season three, which eventually increased to $1 million per episode by seasons nine and ten – approximately $25 million per year. Alongside Cox and actress Lisa Kudrow, who portrays Phoebe, Aniston became the highest-paid television actress of all time. By then, Aniston had surpassed Cox as the show's most famous cast member due to having launched an international hair trend with the "Rachel" and successfully transitioning into a film career, combined with her high-profile relationship with her then-husband, actor Brad Pitt, who had once guest starred in an episode of the show. At times the producers would use the actress' popularity to boost the show's ratings, notably her character's seventh season kiss with actress Winona Ryder and pregnancy arc. Aniston had been telling the press that the show's ninth season would be her last, and was initially hesitant to return to Friends to film its tenth and final season. She explained to NBC's Matt Lauer, "I wanted it to end when people still loved us and we were on a high. And then I was also feeling like, ‘How much more of Rachel do I have in me?’” However, the actress ultimately agreed to complete the tenth season of Friends, which was reduced from 24 to 18 episodes to accommodate Aniston's busy film schedule.

Characterization and themes 
Rachel is the youngest of Friends six main characters. She was brought up in Long Island, New York. The term "spoiled" is often used to describe the character's personality during her early appearances. Encyclopædia Britannica describes Rachel as a spoiled and funny character. According to Rachel's original character description, written by Crane and Kauffman themselves for the show's pilot, the character is a spoiled yet courageous young woman who "has worked for none of what she has", unlike best friend Monica, and is initially "equipped to do nothing". James Endrst of the Hartford Courant identified her as "a spoiled rich kid", while the Daily News dubbed Rachel an "endearingly spoiled Daddy's girl". Author Kim Etingoff wrote about Rachel in her book Jennifer Aniston: From Friends to Films  that the character is "spunky and sometimes spoiled", while TV Land called her "naive." Citing the differences between Rachel and her two female friends, The Guardians Ryan Gilbey observed that the character "wasn't insulated by self-regard, like Monica, or swaddled in gormlessness, like Phoebe". Frequently identified as fitting the "girl next door" archetype, Anne Bilson of The Telegraph described Rachel as "funny but not too funny, pretty but not too pretty, sexy but not too sexy, scatterbrained but not too scatterbrained". TalkTalk's Dominic Wills described the character as "smart but ditzy, determined but undisciplined." Meanwhile, Liat Kornowski, writing for The Huffington Post, wrote that Rachel is a "beautiful, coveted, slightly neurotic, borderline egocentric" character.

Observing that the show's main characters are each based on a stereotype, Jonathan Bernstein of The Daily Telegraph identified Rachel as "the self-absorbed one who goes from riches to rags". According to Reign Magazine, Rachel is "a human being full of vulnerability, humor and strength while aesthetically donning an undeniable beauty and allure". Originally depicted as a character who is unprepared for "the world as an adult", Rachel's personality was gradually tailored to suit Aniston as the series progressed, becoming "more self-sufficient and sympathetic". According to Shining in the Shadows: Movie Stars of the 2000s author Murray Pomerance, "The more boundary collapsed between the 'real' Jennifer Aniston and Rachel, the more 'authentic' Aniston became." Pomerance also noted that the character's "well-roundedness, normalcy and relatability" is similar to Aniston's, while both the character and the actress herself are very expressive, talking "with [their] hands a good deal." In her book How To Write For Television, author Madeline Dimaggio wrote that although "Rachel grew within the context of the series ... she would always struggle with the spoiled, image-conscious Daddy's girl who fled from her wedding in the pilot." Similarly, BuddyTV wrote that although Rachel "eventually evolves into being less absorbed in later series, she [remains] the most image-centric among the six", while Vogue's Edward Barsamian opined, "She might have been self-centered and bratty, but Rachel Green was perhaps the most stylish and unabashedly fashion-obsessed character on the show." TV Land summarized the character's arc and development in the website's biography of her, writing, "Rachel is a born shopper, but... she’s not necessarily a born worker. In fact, before moving in with Monica, she’s never had to work at all, thanks to the generosity of her parents. Luckily, Rachel is smart, resourceful and chic, so her future is bright, both as a member of the workforce and with her newfound tribe." Examining the character's sexuality, Splitsider's Mike D'Avria determined that Rachel has had the third most sexual partners, 14, as well as the highest percentage of serious monogamous relationships at 71%. D'Avria opined, "Throughout the whole series Rachel is continually meeting men she wants to impress. Her flirtations typically fail, but she somehow winds up in a serious relationship with them." Additionally, Rachel is also the only female character to admit to having had a homosexual experience (Chandler having likewise admitted to kissing a man on season 7, episode 4).

In an interview with the Jewish Telegraph, Kauffman confirmed that Rachel is Jewish. On the character's "Jewish ties", Kauffman told J. The Jewish News of Northern California that Rachel had always been Jewish "in our minds", explaining, "You can’t create a character with the name 'Rachel Green' and not from the get-go make some character choices". Prior to this, critics and fans had long speculated whether or not Rachel is Jewish. Vulture's Lindsey Weber, who identifies herself as Jewish, observed several similarities and Jewish stereotypes she shares with the character, citing the facts that Rachel refers to her grandmother Ida Green as "Bubbe", Long Island origin, and engagement to a Jewish doctor as allusions to the character's Jewish culture. In her book Changed for Good: A Feminist History of the Broadway Musical, author Stacy Wolf identified Rachel as one of several popular female television characters who embodied Jewish stereotypes during the 1990s and often served as "the butt of the shows' jokes". Meanwhile, JDate's Rebecca Frankel cited Rachel as one of the earliest and most prominent examples of the Jewish American Princess stereotype on screen. Writing for the University of North Carolina at Chapel Hill, Alicia R. Korenman also acknowledged Rachel's initial Jewish American Princess qualities, describing her as "spoiled, dependent on her father's money and her fiance's, is horrified at the thought of working for a living and generally inept in her attempts to do so, and is eventually revealed to have had a nose job", which she eventually overcomes as they become less "evident in later seasons of the show". In his article "Princesses, Schlemiels, Punishers and Overbearing Mothers", Evan Cooper described Rachel as a "de-semitized" Jew because, aside from her name, "there is never any discussion of experiences of growing up in a Jewish culture, no use of Yiddish, and few, if any, references to family members with distinctively Jewish surnames". Cooper continued to write that although Rachel possesses some Jewish American Princess traits, she is more similar to the "little woman" stereotype. The New York Post's Robert Rorke labeled Rachel "a rehabilitated Jewish American Princess", in contrast to her sister Amy (Christina Applegate) who remains "selfish, condescending and narcissistic".

Critical reception 
Critical response towards Rachel remained mostly positive throughout the show's ten-season run. Writing for The A.V. Club, John Reid believes that Rachel is responsible for the success of the pilot, explaining, "The story of this group of friends must start with a stranger coming to town," describing Rachel as "the perfect stranger for this plot". Reid also holds Rachel responsible for spurring character development in the show's five other main characters, calling her arrival "a catalyst for all of them to grow, because unlike the rest of them, Rachel is interested in finding meaning for her life". Also writing for The A.V. Club, Sonia Saraiya enjoyed Rachel's first awkward encounter with Ross because, for the first time, "Rachel displays a moment of true empathy for another human being". Saraiya went on to hail Rachel as "a model for women coming of age in the 1990s—the popular, pretty girl dissatisfied with where those illusions have taken her but also unwilling to embrace the more aggressively 'feminist' career-woman strategy". The New York Times' Joseph Hanania enjoyed Rachel's telephone conversation with her father during the pilot, describing it as "hilarious." The Los Angeles Times Bob Shayne admitted his attraction towards Rachel, joking, "my feelings for Rachel, I say with some embarrassment, mirror those of Gunther". Cosmopolitan touted Rachel "the best fictional gal pal we've ever had". While People called her "spoiled-but-lovable", TV Guide described Rachel as "neurotic and adorable". Writing for Heat, Ellen Kerry hailed Rachel's gradual transformation from waitress to businesswoman as arguably "the best thing on tv".

USA Today's Robert Bianco credits Rachel's pregnancy storyline with saving Friends, observing that the arc increased the show's ratings while ultimately "reversing the show's decline in ways ... that no one watching 'The One with Monica and Chandler's Wedding' could ever have imagined." Bianco concluded, "Indeed, without that fortune-altering twist, Friends probably would have ended sooner". BDCwire ranked "The One with the Ball", "The One with Rachel's Inadvertent Kiss", "The One With The Football", "The One with the Fake Party" and "The One In Vegas, Part One" Rachel's five strongest episodes. Meanwhile, TVLine criticized Rachel for sleeping with ex-fiancé Barry in season one's "The One With the Evil Orthodontist", panning the episode as "cringeworthy". TVLine similarly criticized the character's role in season four's "The One With The Fake Party". At times the character would generate mild controversy, specifically the second-season episode "The One Where Dr. Ramoray Dies", during which Rachel and Monica argue over who will get to use the last remaining condom in the apartment, which Rachel ultimately wins via a game of rock-paper-scissors. Additionally, fans would often approach Aniston and scold her for decisions that Rachel makes within the show that they do not particularly agree with.

Within the first two seasons of Friends, the character became extremely popular among women. Viewers' perpetual desire to see Rachel succeed helped her remain a fan favorite throughout all ten seasons of the show. Writing for TalkTalk, Dominic Wills agreed that while Rachel established herself as "the general favourite ... No one had a bad word to say about Jennifer Aniston", with whose performance audiences instantly fell in love. Aniston's performance has been consistently praised since her debut in the pilot, about which Entertainment Weekly's Ken Tucker wrote that the actress portrays Rachel with "prickly intelligence". Writing for The Baltimore Sun, David Zurawik cited Aniston among the show's "very strong cast", while Variety's Tony Scott agreed that "All six of the principals ... appear resourceful and display sharp sitcom skills"; Robert Bianco of the Pittsburgh Post-Gazette praised the work of show's female cast equally. TV Guide wrote that Aniston "instantly charmed audiences with her perfect looks and endearingly flawed persona", while Kevin Fallon of The Daily Beast referred to Aniston's tenure on Friends as not "a leading lady performance" but instead "the work of a brilliant character actress". The Guardian's Ryan Gilbey highlighted Aniston as the cast member "least reliant on goofball caricature", observing that "Playing the only character with whom a sane viewer might reasonably identify also meant that she got the lion's share of attention". Writing that the actress "quickly stole our hearts as the daddy’s girl and aspiring fashionista," Andrew Collins of Radio Times hailed Aniston as a "natural comic performer, as adept with a subtle nose wrinkle as a full-on pratfall, and fluent in quick-fire patter". In 2002, Aniston won the Emmy Award for Outstanding Lead Actress in a Comedy Series. In 2003, the actress won the Golden Globe Award for Best Performance by an Actress In A Television Series – Comedy Or Musical. Dominic Willis of TalkTalk believes that Aniston won these awards because of "her brilliant comic performances in the show".

Relationships 
Rachel has had several romantic relationships throughout Friends decade-long run, the most famous and prominent of which remains her on-again, off-again relationship with friend Ross. Although wildly popular among audiences, the couple has been met with mixed reviews from critics. Katherine Hassel of the Daily Express described the characters' relationship as "the heart of the show". China Daily cited Ross and Rachel's reunion during the series finale "The Last One" among the episode's highlights, while Gary Susman of Rolling Stone believes that audiences would not have been happy had the couple not ultimately reunited. Contrastingly, The Wire's Joe Reid is of the opinion that the show's second season is "the only time Ross/Rachel was truly great". Virgin Media wrote that the couple's dynamics "had grown mightily tedious" by season ten. E! cable network ranked Rachel and Ross the ninth greatest Friends couple, writing that their relationship gave "Friends fans enough iconic quotes to fill a book", considering Phoebe's line "See? [Ross is] her lobster!" to be among show's most iconic. Ross and Rachel's season three breakup has spawned a debate among Friends fans, who continue to argue over which of the two was at fault: Rachel for suggesting that they take a break from their relationship, or Ross for sleeping with another woman immediately afterwards. Writing for E!, Jenna Mullins ruled in favor of Rachel, elaborating, "there is no excuse for Ross sleeping with someone else after his lobster suggested taking a break", concluding that Ross "blew it". The Jewish community was particularly receptive to the fact that a Jewish-American couple existed on prime time television, described by Lilith magazine as "a televisual first".

Rachel and Ross are considered to be among television's greatest and most beloved couples. Ninemsn referred to them as "everyone's favourite on ... off ... on (a break!) duo," while Us Weekly and BuzzFeed ranked them the first and second best television couple, respectively. TV Guide ranked Ross and Rachel the third greatest television couple, dubbing them "the most iconic TV couple in recent memory". Extra placed the couple at number eight, writing, "Never did we want two people to get together more than Ross ... and Rachel". Refinery29 included Rachel and Ross in the website's "16 TV Couples We Want To Be Together Forever" list. The pair is also often ranked among television's greatest "will they or won't they" couples. Naming Ross and Rachel the greatest "will they, won't they" couple, Network Ten believes they defined the term, while Suggest dubbed them the "quintessential will they/won’t they couple". According to Sarah Doran of Radio Times, the couple "became synonymous with the phrase 'we're on a break'". Phoebe's line, in which she refers to the couple as each other's lobsters, has become one of the show's most popular and oft-quoted. Kaitlin Reilly of Bustle magazine defined the term as "the person of whom another is meant to be with forever". Tara Aquino of Complex magazine believes that "Every other person can tell you what exactly a 'Ross and Rachel' relationship means". Ultimately, Rachel's season eight pregnancy arc is credited with reviving the show's ratings and reviews.

During season ten, Rachel's brief romance with friend Joey drew strong criticism from both critics and fans, although the contested relationship did not harm viewership. Joshua Kurp of Splitsider believes that the Rachel/Joey/Ross love triangle is the main reason the show's final two seasons continued to perform well despite mediocre reviews. Eric Goldman of IGN referred to the Rachel-Joey storyline as "questionable". Entertainment Tonight Canada ranked "The One After Rachel and Joey Kiss" among the show's ten worst episodes at number five, with author I. P. Johnson panning it as "desperate", concluding, "Jeers for even conceiving this romantic plot; cheers for abandoning it".<ref>{{cite web|url=http://www.etcanada.com/tv/photos/the_worst_of_the_best_friends_weakest_episodes.aspx#!0e8c2032a8cebe1f9ed25f390c12c3d9 |title=The Worst Of The Best: 'Friends Weakest Episodes |last=Johnson |first=I. P |website=Entertainment Tonight Canada |archive-url=https://web.archive.org/web/20151031131006/http://www.etcanada.com/tv/photos/the_worst_of_the_best_friends_weakest_episodes.aspx |archive-date=October 31, 2015 |url-status=dead |access-date=March 27, 2015 }}</ref> Contrarily, E! enjoyed Rachel and Joey as a couple because they brought out positive aspects in each other's personalities and share a similar sense of humor. Their relationship also spawned a debate among fans, who argued over whether making Rachel and Joey a couple was a bad idea. Jenna Mullins of E! determined that it is because "It was too far into the series to throw these two together. They didn't make sense and their romantic scenes felt forced".

After Ross and Rachel's break up, there were many hints that they would eventually reunite forever, especially seasons 8–10. In the final season, Rachel wants to sleep with Ross when her father has a heart attack and wants "sympathy sex", which he turns down, not wanting to take advantage of her in the state she is in. However, Ross and Rachel do sleep together again the night before she leaves for Paris, which results in him admitting he still loves her and wants to get back together in the series finale. Rachel turns down the Paris job in order to be with Ross when she realizes she still loves him too, and the two agree "this is it", getting back together for good. Jennifer Aniston, who played Rachel, confirmed that after the series finale, Ross and Rachel got remarried, happily and had at least one more child.

 Impact and legacy 
Rachel's popularity would establish her as the show's breakout character; she is often ranked among the greatest characters in television history. Us Weekly ranked Rachel the most beloved television character of the past two decades, citing her as "one of TV's most endearing personalities". Entertainment Weekly ranked the character sixth on a similar countdown, while AOL TV included Rachel among television's hundred "Greatest Women" at number 23, with author Kim Potts observing that "Rachel became one of viewers' favorite Friends because she grew from what could have been a one-note character ... into a more independent, caring pal". BuddyTV ranked Rachel the 15th funniest female character in sitcom history, while ChaCha collectively ranked Rachel, Monica and Phoebe 11th, 12th and 13th on the website's list of the "Top 16 Female TV Characters of All Time". According to The Hollywood Reporter, Hollywood professionals voted Rachel the 29th best female character in 2016. In 2019, Harper's Bazaar ranked Rachel the third most influential "female character who changed our TV screens". Author Olivia Blair wrote that Rachel "promote ideals of female independence, unashamedly discuss sex and female pleasure, educate the men in their lives on how to treat women throughout the ten seasons." Writing for Entertainmentwise, Georgina Littlejohn believes Rachel inspired the character Penny in the sitcom The Big Bang Theory, noting that the characters, both waitresses, are "blonde, cute, funny, likeable girls-next-door". Several baby name books and websites commonly associate the name "Rachel" with the character.

Both Rachel and Aniston became fashion icons due to their combined influence on womenswear during the 1990s, particularly among British women. Vogue's Edward Barsamian credits Rachel with inspiring "the cool New York look". According to Stylist, Rachel "revived [a] love of denim shirts and dungarees", while Mahogany Clayton of StyleBlazer believes that the character "managed to dominate every fashion trend that passed by her radar in the most stylish ways possible". Hailing her as the "Fash Queen", Heat magazine observed the character's influence on plaid skirts, denim and overalls. Citing every costume the character wore during the first season of Friends, BuzzFeed determined that Rachel popularized the mullet dress. TV Guide published a list of "The 17 Ways Rachel from Friends Changed '90s Fashion". Rachel is often considered to be one of television's best dressed characters. Elle included Rachel in the magazine's "50 Best Dressed Women on TV" list. PopSugar ranked Friends 15th on the website's list of "50 TV Shows That Changed the Way We Dress", citing Rachel's "impressive" wardrobe. InStyle ranked Friends the 36th most fashionable television show of all time, praising Rachel, Monica and Phoebe's costumes. StyleCaster ranked Rachel among "The 50 Most Stylish TV Characters Of All Time" at number 28. Cosmopolitan magazine compiled a list of "16 things Rachel Green wore to work that we'd totally wear today", while Virgin Media ranked the character among television's sexiest. Brides magazine ranked Rachel's wedding dress among "The Best TV Wedding Dresses", with contributor Jane Frankfort commending the dress with "set[ting] the tone for the following 10 years together and the many milestones our favorite friends will bring".

Like her character, Aniston became the show's breakout star. Karen Thomas of USA Today dubbed Aniston "our favorite Friend". According to Turner Classic Movies, Aniston ultimately became "One of the most popular television actresses of her era". According to Jennifer Aniston: From Friends to Films author Kim Etingoff, the actress' own fame "outshone" those of her co-stars, becoming the first cast member to "rise to prominence"; the actress continues to experience the most post-Friends success. Aniston's performance in Friends led to a successful film career. According to The Inquisitr News, Rachel is "the role that would end up launching [Aniston's] success", while Bradford Evans of Splitsider believes "that Jennifer Aniston likely wouldn't have become a major movie star without Friends". While ranking Aniston the most attractive sitcom star of the 1990s, Josh Robertson of Complex magazine wrote that "With the haircut, the TV fame, and a true gift for comedy ... combined, Aniston became a big star", replacing Cox as the show's "established hottie". According to Steve Charnock of Yahoo! Movies, Aniston is "the series' only main cast member to become a bona fide movie star since the end of the show". While agreeing that Aniston's film career has been successful, several critics believe that the actress' filmography remains limited to playing Rachel-like roles in romantic comedies, save for some exceptions. Ryan Gilbey of The Guardian noted that "Consequently, many of Aniston's movie roles ... have been Rachel in all but name." Andrew Collins of Radio Times agreed, writing that Aniston "seems trapped, perpetually playing variations of Rachel". According to TV Guide, Aniston is "usually called upon to play a variation of her neurotic and adorable Friends character". Aniston cites Rachel as one of three roles for which she is most grateful, to whom she "owe[s] everything". On being typecast in the aftermath of Rachel, Aniston admits that at times it "gives you more of a challenge, to shape people’s perceptions of you". as audiences struggle "to lose the Rachel tag that has made her one of the world's most recognisable faces".

 Hair 

Named after the character, the "Rachel" refers to a bouncy layered shag inspired by the way in which Aniston wore her hair on Friends between 1994 and 1996, during the first and second seasons of the series. The "Rachel" debuted in the show's 20th episode, "The One with the Evil Orthodontist". Aniston believes that her hair stylist, Chris McMillan, created the haircut while he was under the influence of marijuana. The "Rachel" immediately became popular among women, launching an international hair trend. The popularity of the "Rachel" coincided with the popularity of Friends during the mid-to-late-1990s. Marie Claire estimates that 11 million women donned the hairstyle throughout the decade, while the Daily Express determined that the hairstyle was most popular among British women, who went to hair salons "clutching magazine pictures of Aniston" and asking hairdressers to give them the look.

According to Vanity Fair, the hairstyle's "widespread popularity ... in the show's very first year cemented the sitcom early on as heavily influential when it came to style". The "Rachel" remains one of the most popular hairstyles in history, and became the most popular hairstyle in the United States since actress Farrah Fawcett's. Hair stylists credit its appeal and popularity to its medium length and volume, combined with its tendency to frame the face flatteringly. Hairdresser Mark Woolley described it as "a cut that flatters almost everyone, designed to make women look beautiful". The "Rachel" is often ranked among the greatest and most iconic hairstyles of all time, with Redbook placing it at number four and Time ranking it ninth. The Huffington Post determined that the hairstyle is one of "The Most Famous TV Hairstyles Of All Time". US Weekly ranked the "Rachel" the 17th most iconic hairstyle. Glamour magazine ranked the "Rachel" fourth on the magazine's list of "The 100 Best Hairstyles of All Time". The magazine also cited it among "The very best hair to have graced the small screen", while ranking it the most memorable hairstyle in television history. The Sydney Morning Herald ranked it the second greatest television hairstyle, while Metro ranked the "Rachel" the character's second-best hairstyle. Ranked sixth on Entertainment Weekly's list of the "25 Fashion Moments That Changed Entertainment", the haircut was declared the most "desired" hairstyle of the Clinton era.

Zahra Barnes of Self joked that Rachel's hair has always been the "true star of the show". Lauding the "Rachel" as one of television's greatest hairstyles, Sarah Carrillo of Elle magazine believed that its popularity "helped make Friends the phenomenon it was". Opining that Friends spawned few memorable catchphrases in comparison to its contemporaries, Tom Jicha of The Baltimore Sun attributes much of the show's legacy to the hairstyle, calling it the show's "only cultural trend". Josh Robertson of Complex magazine felt that "With the haircut, the TV fame, and a true gift for comedy ... combined, Aniston became a big star", replacing Courteney Cox. Hannah Lyons Powell of Glamour agreed that the hairstyle made Aniston "the definitive hair icon of the ‘90s and the proud owner of arguably the most infamous and influential hairstyle of all time". According to Jim Vorel of Paste magazine, "'the Rachel' hairstyle became the decade’s defining 'do, calling it "the definition of influence". However, Rebecca Cox of Glamour'' is grateful that the hairstyle remained in the 1990s.

In the second-season episode "The One with the Lesbian Wedding", Rachel references the popularity of her haircut when she complains that her own overbearing mother is trying to reinvent her life after hers, lamenting, "Couldn't she just copy my haircut?" Despite her association with the cut, Aniston disliked the hairstyle. She found maintaining the hairstyle without McMillan's help difficult, stating "I'd curse Chris every time I had to blowdry. It took three brushes—it was like doing surgery!" and that she would rather shave her head than have to wear it for the rest of her life. Since Aniston, several other celebrities have worn variations of the "Rachel", among them actresses Cameron Diaz, Rachel McAdams, Emma Watson, Reese Witherspoon, Julia Roberts, comedian Tina Fey, model Tyra Banks, and singer Lily Allen.

Family tree

References

External links 

Fictional American Jews
Fictional characters from New York City
Television characters introduced in 1994
Fictional cheerleaders
Fictional people in fashion
Fictional waiting staff
Friends (1994 TV series) characters
American female characters in television